Elsie Margaret Wagg (1876–April 1949) was an English philanthropist. She is credited with creating the idea of opening gardens for charity, and co-founded the National Garden Scheme.

Early life

Wagg was brought up in a wealthy household in Sussex and London with her two brothers Alfred and Henry. The family home was "The Hermitage", East Grinstead where Wagg developed her love of gardening.

Charitable work
Wagg was on the fundraising committee of the Queen Victoria’s Jubilee Institute for Nurses (now the Queen's Nursing Institute (QNI)). In 1926, members were asked for new ideas and Wagg reputedly said: "Many of us around this table have lovely gardens. Why don't we open them to the public and charge them a shilling a time". It may be that Wagg had gained some inspiration from Margaret Loder, who had opened Leonardslee Gardens in 1924 (raising £170 for charity). 

Wagg gained the support of Lady Hilda March, who persuaded King George V to participate by opening Sandringham; others later volunteered their gardens as well and the first gardens opened at Whitsuntide (early June) in 1927. It was so successful that on 24 June it was announced that the programme would continue through July and August. That year 609 gardens opened at 1 shilling admission raising over £8,000 (worth about £450k today) from 164,000 visitors.

The King suggested this become an annual event and the National Garden Scheme was created as a fundraising committee of the QNI.

Wagg was honorary secretary of the NGS 1927–1946, and became vice-president in 1948. In 1934 she was awarded the MBE for 21 years of service to the Queen's Institute of District Nursing. However she did not open her own garden for the charity until 1929.

Wagg died in 1949. leaving an estate of £148,598.1s.4d. In 1963 the Elsie Wagg Fund became a charity for invalid and aged nurses.

She has featured in several books including Garden Heroes and Villains, Gardening Women: Their Stories From 1600 to the Present and The Joy of Gardening.

References

1876 births
1949 deaths
English philanthropists